Show Me Love may refer to:

 Show Me Love (film) or Fucking Åmål, a 1998 Swedish film
 "Show Me Love" (Dawson's Creek), a television episode
 Show Me Love (album) or the title song (see below), by Robin S., 1993

Songs
 "Show Me Love" (Alicia Keys and Miguel song), 2019
 "Show Me Love" (Bressie song), 2013
 "Show Me Love" (Robin S. song), 1990
 "Show Me Love" (Robin Schulz song), 2015
 "Show Me Love" (Robyn song), 1997
 "Show Me Love" (Tove Styrke song), 2022
 "Show Me Love" (t.A.T.u. song), 2002
 "Show Me Love" (Yaki-Da song), 1994
 "Show Me Love (America)", by the Wanted, 2013
 "Show Me Love (Not a Dream)", by Utada Hikaru, 2010
 "Show Me Love", by Armin van Buuren from Balance, 2019
 "Show Me Love", by Delorentos, 2014
 "Show Me Love", by Hundred Waters, 2014

See also 
 Show Me Your Love (disambiguation)